The 2021 3. divisjon (referred to as Norsk Tipping-ligaen for sponsorship reasons) was a fourth-tier Norwegian football league season. The league consisted of 84 teams divided into 6 groups of 14 teams each. The season began in early August 2021. All teams played 13 matches instead of the normal 26. Furthermore, all reserve teams ("2" teams) were barred from promotion.

League tables

Group 1

Group 2

Group 3

Group 4

Group 5

Group 6

Top scorers

References

Norwegian Third Division seasons
4
Norway
Norway
Association football events postponed due to the COVID-19 pandemic
Norwegian Third Division